Picochlorum eukaryotum, also called Nanochlorum eukaryotum, is a species of marine coccoidal green algae.

This alga is approximately 1.5 microns in size.  Initial research showed it to be related to Chlorella vulgaris.

References

Chlorellales
Enigmatic algae taxa